Acrossocheilus iridescens is a species of cyprinid fish native to freshwater in southeastern China, northern Laos, and northern Vietnam. It has sometimes included A. longipinnis as a subspecies, but recent authorities recognize them as separate species.

References

Iridescens
Freshwater fish of China
Fish of Laos
Fish of Vietnam
Fish described in 1927
Taxa named by John Treadwell Nichols
Taxa named by Clifford H. Pope